Thornton Middle School may refer to:

 International School at Thornton Middle, part of the Adams 12 Five Star Schools in Thornton, Colorado
 Thornton Middle School, part of the Cypress-Fairbanks Independent School District in Harris County, Texas
 Ronald Thornton Middle School, part of the Fort Bend Independent School District in Sienna Plantation, Texas